The Graham Publishing Company was a book and magazine publisher that operated in Salisbury, Rhodesia, during, at least, the 1960s, 1970s, and early 1980s.

Operations
The company published a wide range of books aimed largely at the white settler market, as well as a magazine called Illustrated Life Rhodesia which was also targeted at the same market. However, shortly after Rhodesia achieved independence as Zimbabwe in 1980, the company published the autobiography of a black leader, Maurice Nyagumbo, which was described later that year as "probably the most important publishing event in post-independent Zimbabwe".

See also

 Kenya Literature Bureau
 University of Namibia Press
 Vakoka Vakiteny
 WordAlive Publishers

References

Companies with year of establishment missing
Companies with year of disestablishment missing
Defunct book publishing companies
Mass media in Harare
Magazine publishing companies
Rhodesian culture
Book publishing companies of Zimbabwe
Magazine publishing companies of Zimbabwe